Juan Carlos Blengio (born 26 June 1980 in San Fernando, Buenos Aires) is a retired Argentine footballer. He is currently the head coach of Tigre B.

Career
Blengio started his playing career in 2000 with Tigre in the Argentine 3rd division. In 2004-2005 the club won both of the league titles to secure promotion to the 2nd division. In 2007 the club were promoted to the Argentine Primera División. The Apertura 2007 was Tigre's first season in the Primera since 1980, and Blengio's first taste of top flight football. Blengio was a key member of the first team, playing in 14 of Tigre's 19 games. The club finished in 2nd place which was the highest league finish in their history.

Blengio left Tigre in July 2009 and joined Greek club Atromitos FC on loan. However, he returned to Tigre the following season. He left Tigre in July 2012, when he signed for one season with Gimnasia y Esgrima La Plata.
He stayed another year in La Plata, until his contract finalized and he returned to Tigre in 2014.

Honours

References

External links
 Juan Carlos Blengio at BDFA.com.ar 
  
 Football-Lineups player profile
 Juan Carlos Blengio at Footballdatabase

1980 births
Living people
People from San Fernando de la Buena Vista
Argentine footballers
Association football defenders
Argentine expatriate footballers
Argentine Primera División players
Primera B Metropolitana players
Super League Greece players
Club Atlético Tigre footballers
Club de Gimnasia y Esgrima La Plata footballers
Atromitos F.C. players
Expatriate footballers in Greece
Argentine expatriate sportspeople in Greece
Sportspeople from Buenos Aires Province